Richard Elmer Humbert (December 31, 1918 – May 23, 2007) was an American football player.  He played professionally as an end and defensive end in the National Football League (NFL) for the Philadelphia Eagles in 1941 and again from 1945 to 1949.  Humbert played college football as the University of Richmond.  He was inducted into the Virginia Sports Hall of Fame in 1981.

References

External links

 
 

1918 births
2007 deaths
American football defensive ends
American football ends
Richmond Spiders football players
Philadelphia Eagles players
United States Navy personnel of World War II
Sportspeople from Reading, Pennsylvania
Players of American football from Pennsylvania